Events from the year 1990 in Michigan.

Top Michigan news stories
Broadcast and newspaper members of the Associated Press voted on the top news stories in Michigan for 1990 as follows:

 On November 6, 1990, State Senator John Engler upset incumbent Governor James Blanchard in the closest gubernatorial election in Michigan history. Engler received 1,279,745 votes, and Blanchard received 1,260,611 votes. A poll by The Detroit News, released two days before the election, showed Blanchard with 54% to 40% for Engler.
 On June 3, 1990, Dr. Jack Kevorkian, a retired pathologist living in Royal Oak, assisted Janet Adkins, a 54-year-old Alzheimer's patient from Oregon, to end her life using his homemade suicide machine. On December 3, 1990, Kevorkian was charged with murder for his role in Adkins' death. The charges were dismissed 10 days later when an Oakland County judge ruled that the legal status of assisted suicide was unclear.
 In November 1990, as part of the Keating Five investigation, the U.S. Senate Ethics Committee conducted hearings into ties between Senator Donald Riegle and former thrift operator Charles Keating, a central figure in the savings and loan crisis of the late 1980s. The committee ultimately concluded that Riegle and the other four senators "broke no laws or Senate ethics rules, but were aggressive in their actions on behalf of Charles Keating."
 In August 1990, Governor James Blanchard dropped 78-year-old Lieutenant Governor Martha Griffiths as his running mate.
 A new law took effect in Michigan requiring girls 17 and younger to obtain parental consent to abortions.
 In June 1990, Lawrence DeLisle was convicted by a jury of murder in connection with the deaths of his four children for driving the family's station wagon into the Detroit River in Wyandotte.
 On September 18, 1990, the M. V. Jupiter, a 393-foot tanker carrying a million gallons of gasoline, exploded and burned at a dock on the Saginaw River in Bay City. One crewman was killed.
 Former Detroit deputy police chief Kenneth Weiner was tried for fraud. He was convicted in January 1991.
 The search for a low-level radioactive waste dump.
 On December 3, 1990, in the 1990 Wayne County Airport runway collision, two Northwest Airlines planes collided on the ground in dense fog. Eight persons were killed.

Office holders

State office holders

 Governor of Michigan: James Blanchard (Democrat)
 Lieutenant Governor of Michigan: Martha Griffiths (Democrat) 
 Michigan Attorney General: Frank J. Kelley (Democrat)
 Michigan Secretary of State: Richard H. Austin (Democrat)
 Speaker of the Michigan House of Representatives: Lewis N. Dodak (Democrat)
 Majority Leader of the Michigan Senate: John Engler (Republican)
 Chief Justice, Michigan Supreme Court:

Mayors of major cities
 Mayor of Detroit: Coleman Young
 Mayor of Grand Rapids: Gerald R. Helmholdt
 Mayor of Flint: Matthew S. Collier
 Mayor of Lansing: Terry John McKane
 Mayor of Ann Arbor: Gerald Jernigan (Republican)

Federal office holders

 U.S. Senator from Michigan: Donald W. Riegle Jr. (Democrat)
 U.S. Senator from Michigan: Carl Levin (Democrat) 
 House District 1: John Conyers (Democrat)
 House District 2: Carl Pursell (Republican)
 House District 3: Howard Wolpe (Republican)
 House District 4: Fred Upton (Republican)
 House District 5: Harold S. Sawyer (Republican)
 House District 6: Bob Carr (Democrat)
 House District 7: Dale Kildee (Democrat)
 House District 8: J. Bob Traxler (Democrat)
 House District 9: Guy Vander Jagt (Republican)
 House District 10: Bill Schuette (Republican)
 House District 11: Robert William Davis (Republican)
 House District 12: David Bonior (Democrat)
 House District 13: George Crockett Jr. (Democrat)
 House District 14: Dennis M. Hertel (Democrat)
 House District 15: William D. Ford (Democrat)
 House District 16: John Dingell (Democrat)
 House District 17: Sander Levin (Democrat)
 House District 18: William Broomfield (Republican)

Population

Sports

Baseball
 1990 Detroit Tigers season – Under manager Sparky Anderson, the Tigers compiled a 79–83 record and finished third in American League East. The team's statistical leaders included Alan Trammell with a .304 batting average, Cecil Fielder with 51 home runs and 132 RBIs, Jack Morris with 15 wins, and Ed Nunez with a 2.24 earned run average.

American football
 1990 Detroit Lions season – Under head coach Wayne Fontes, the Lions compiled a 6–10 record and finished third in the NFC Central Division. The team's statistical leaders included Rodney Peete with 1,974 passing yards, Barry Sanders with 1,304 rushing yards and 96 points scored, and Robert Clark with 914 receiving yards.
 1990 Michigan Wolverines football team – Under head coach Gary Moeller, the Wolverines compiled a 9–3 record, tied for the Big Ten Conferencechampionship, defeated Ole Miss in the 1991 Gator Bowl, and were ranked No. 7 in the final AP poll. The team's statistical leaders included Elvis Grbac with 1,911 passing yards, Jon Vaughn with 1,364 rushing yards, Desmond Howard with 1,025 receiving yards, and J. D. Carlson with 95 points scored.
 1990 Michigan State Spartans football team – Under head coach George Perles, the Spartans compiled an 8–3–1 record, defeated USC in the John Hancock Bowl, and were ranked No. 16 in the final AP poll. The team's statistical leaders included Dan Enos with 1,677 passing yards, Tico Duckett with 1,394 rushing yards, James Bradley with 517 receiving yards, and Hyland Hickson with 90 points scored.

Basketball
 1989–90 Detroit Pistons season – Under head coach Chuck Daly, the Pistons compiled a 59–23 record, finished first in the NBA's Central Division, and defeated the Portland Trail Blazers in the 1990 NBA Finals. The team's statistical leaders included Isaiah Thomas with 1,492 points and 764 assists and Dennis Rodman with 792 rebounds.

Ice hockey
 1989–90 Detroit Red Wings season – Under head coach Jacques Demers, the Red Wings compiled a 28–38–14 record and finished fifth in the NHL Norris Division. Steve Yzerman led the team with 62 goals, 65 assists, and 127 points. The team's goaltenders included Glen Hanlon (45 games) and Tim Cheveldae (28 games).

Other

Music and culture

 January 18 - Estonian conductor Neeme Järvi was hired as the 11th music director of the Detroit Symphony Orchestra. He remained in that position until 2005.
 March 27 - Madonna's single Vogue was released. It reached No. 1 on the Billboard Hot 100 and was No. 5 on the year-end chart.
 April to August - Madonna conducted her Blond Ambition World Tour. Rolling Stone called it an "elaborately choreographed, sexually provocative extravaganza" and proclaimed it "the best tour of 1990". The tour generated strong negative reaction from religious groups for her performance of "Like a Virgin", during which two male dancers caressed her body before she simulated masturbation. The tour was later the subject of the documentary film, Madonna: Truth or Dare.
 June 15 - The film Dick Tracy was released featuring Madonna as Breathless Mahoney.
 October 30 - Madonna's single Justify My Love was released. It reached No. 1 on the Billboard Hot 100.

Chronology of events

January

February

March

April

May

June
 June 3 - Dr. Jack Kevorkian, a retired pathologist living in Royal Oak, assisted Janet Adkins, a 54-year-old Alzheimer's patient from Oregon, to end her life using his homemade suicide machine. On December 3, 1990, Kevorkian was charged with murder for his role in Adkins' death. The charges were dismissed 10 days later when an Oakland County judge ruled that the legal status of assisted suicide was unclear.

July

August

September
 September 18 - The M. V. Jupiter, a 393-foot tanker carrying a million gallons of gasoline, exploded and burned at a dock on the Saginaw River in Bay City. One crewman was killed.

October

November
 November 6 - State Senator John Engler upset incumbent Governor James Blanchard in the closest gubernatorial election in Michigan history. Engler received 1,279,745 votes, and Blanchard received 1,260,611 votes. A poll by The Detroit News, released two days before the election, showed Blanchard with 54% to 40% for Engler.

December
 December 3 - 1990 Wayne County Airport runway collision: Two Northwest Airlines planes collided on the ground in dense fog. Eight persons were killed.

Births
 March 4 - Draymond Green, basketball forward, and NBA Defensive Player of the Year (2017), in Saginaw, Michigan
 April 11 - Amanda Chidester, softball player and 2x Big Ten Conference Player of the Year, in Allen Park, Michigan
 September 22 - Denard Robinson, Big Ten Offensive Player of the Year in 2010, in Deerfield Beach, Florida

Gallery of 1990 births

Deaths
 February 9 - Del Shannon, Grand Rapids native and singer-songwriter, best known for his 1961 number 1 Billboard hit "Runaway", at age 55 in Santa Clarita, California
 March 15 - Tom Harmon, 1940 Heisman Trophy winner at the University of Michigan, at age 70 in Los Angeles
 April 7 - Dick Lundy, Sault Ste. Marie native and animator who co-created Donald Duck, at age 82 in San Diego
 October 25 - Bennie Oosterbaan, multi-sport star and later coach at the University of Michigan, at age 84 in Ann Arbor, Michigan

Gallery of 1990 deaths

See also
 History of Michigan
 History of Detroit

References